The Bastien River is a tributary of the north shore of Faillon Lake which is crossed by the Mégiscane River. The Bastien River flows into the town of Senneterre in La Vallée-de-l'Or Regional County Municipality (RCM), in the administrative region of Abitibi-Témiscamingue, in Quebec, Canada.

The course of the river successively crosses the townships of Martin, Valets and Faillon.

The Bastien River flows entirely in forest territory, generally towards the South. Forestry is the main economic activity of this hydrographic slope; recreational tourism activities, second. Road R0806 (Penetration Road) cuts from east to west the lower part of the hydrographic slope of the Bastien River; secondary and forest roads also serve the entire hydrographic slope. The surface of the river is usually frozen from mid-December to mid-April.

Geography

Toponymy
The name "Bastien River" was officialized on December 5, 1968, at the Commission de toponymie du Québec.

See also

References

External links 

Jamésie
La Vallée-de-l’Or
Rivers of Abitibi-Témiscamingue
Nottaway River drainage basin